The Mayo River lies in northern Peru and flows near the city of Moyobamba.

Mayo River is also another name for Chinchipe River, that flows in the same general area.

Rivers of Peru
Rivers of Amazonas Region
Rivers of Cajamarca Region
Rivers of Piura Region

de:Chinchipe
lt:Činčipė
qu:Mayu-Chinchipi mayu